A public transportation benefit area, abbreviated as PTBA, is a type of public-benefit corporation for public transit operators in the U.S. state of Washington.

Description

Public transportation benefit areas are defined by Revised Code of Washington Chapter 36.57A, and are described as special taxing districts created solely for the purpose of funding public transportation. Within Washington state, there are 31 systems that cover all or parts of 23 counties and serve 132 cities. The majority of transit systems in the state are operated by public transportation benefit areas, with the exception of King County Metro (a metropolitan county system) and Sound Transit (a regional transit authority) in the Seattle metropolitan area; as well as county transportation authorities in Columbia County and Grays Harbor County; and city-owned systems in Everett, Pullman, and Yakima.

PTBAs are granted the authority to impose a voter-authorized sales tax of up to 0.9 percent and motor vehicle excise tax of up to 0.4 percent within its boundaries. Community Transit, the PTBA of Snohomish County, was granted a sales tax limit of 1.2 percent in 2015 after exhausting the existing 0.9 percent. PTBAs with boundaries on the Puget Sound are also authorized to provide passenger ferry service in addition to traditional bus, paratransit and vanpool services.

PTBAs are governed by a board of directors of not more than nine elected officials, supplemented by a union representative. In Thurston County, the board is allowed to have citizen members; in Mason County, elected officials on the board include representatives from school boards, fire districts, and hospital districts.

A special type of PTBA for unincorporated areas within counties, called unincorporated transportation benefit areas. , only two UTBAs exist, in Garfield and Whitman counties.

Only two PTBAs serve more than one county: Ben Franklin Transit in Benton and Franklin counties; and Link Transit in Chelan and Douglas counties. These systems are allowed up to 15 members on their board of directors.

History

On July 1, 1975, Governor Daniel J. Evans signed Engrossed Substitute Senate Bill No. 2280 into law, creating the PTBA. The bill had been proposed by the Snohomish County Transportation Authority (SNO-TRAN), who would later use the legislation to establish the state's first PTBA, the Snohomish County Public Transportation Benefit Area Corporation, later renamed Community Transit, in November 1975.

List of public transportation benefit areas

, Washington has 21 PTBAs and two unincorporated systems.

See also
Public transportation in Washington (state)
Non-PTBA transit systems in Washington state:
Everett Transit
Grays Harbor Transit
King County Metro
Pullman Transit
Sound Transit – regional transit authority of Seattle metropolitan area
Yakima Transit

Notes

References

External links
Legal definition: RCW 36.57A
Public Transportation Systems in Washington at the Municipal Research and Services Center
Washington Transit Links from the American Public Transportation Association

Government of Washington (state)
Government-owned companies of the United States
Types of business entity
Special districts of Washington (state)